"And It Feels Like" is a song recorded by American country pop singer LeAnn Rimes. It was released as the lead single from her eighth studio album Whatever We Wanna on May 29, 2006. It was one of the only singles of her career not to be released in the United States.

Track listings
UK maxi-CD single
And It Feels Like - 3:48
And It Feels Like (Friday Night Posse Remix) - 7:52
I Need You (Graham Stack Radio Edit) - 3:42
And It Feels Like (Video) - 3:46

UK CD single
And It Feels Like - 3:48
Little More Time - 3:16

UK digital download
And It Feels Like - 3:48
And It Feels Like (Friday Night Posse Remix) - 7:52
I Need You (Graham Stack Radio Edit) - 3:42

Credits
Credits are adapted from the liner notes of Whatever We Wanna.

 Tom Bukovac - guitar
 Lisa Cochran - backing vocals
 Sherena Dugani - songwriter
 Dan Huff - guitar, producer
 Jay Joyce - guitar
 Charlie Judge - additional productions, keyboards & programming
 Chris McHughes - drums
 LeAnn Rimes - lead vocals
 Steve Robson - songwriter
 Thom Schuyler - songwriter
 Jimme Lee Sloas - bass
 Jeremy Wheatley - additional production & mix

Charts

References

External links
 And It Feels Like music video at official site.
 And It Feels Like lyrics at CMT.com

2006 singles
2006 songs
Curb Records singles
LeAnn Rimes songs
London Records singles
Song recordings produced by Dann Huff
Songs written by Steve Robson
Songs written by Thom Schuyler